Aryeh Bahir (born Aryeh Geller on 1 May 1906, died 13 September 1970) was an Israeli politician who served a member of the Knesset for Mapai, Rafi, the Labor Party and the Alignment.

Biography
Born in Odessa in the Russian Empire (today in Ukraine), Bahir studied at the Hebrew Gymnasium and Polytechnic in his home city, and was a member of Hashomer Hatzair. He made aliyah to Mandatory Palestine in 1924, and was one of the founders of kibbutz Afikim in 1932. He was an activist for the HaKibbutz HaMeuhad movement, and also served on the board of directors of Solel Boneh construction company.

A leader of the Netzah (Youth Pioneers) faction of Hashomer Hatzair, Bahir later joined Mapai. He was elected to the first Knesset on Mapai's list in 1949. Although he lost his seat in the 1951 elections, he returned to the Knesset after the 1955 elections. He lost his seat again in 1959.

In 1965, he joined Ben-Gurion's new Rafi party, and was on its list for the elections that year. Although he missed out on a seat, he entered the Knesset on 20 February 1967 as a replacement for Yizhar Smiliansky. During his third term, Rafi merged into the Labor Party, which then became the Alignment. He lost his seat in the 1969 elections and died the following year.

References

External links
 

1906 births
1970 deaths
Odesa Jews
Soviet emigrants to Mandatory Palestine
Hashomer Hatzair members
Mapai politicians
Rafi (political party) politicians
Israeli Labor Party politicians
Members of the 1st Knesset (1949–1951)
Members of the 3rd Knesset (1955–1959)
Members of the 6th Knesset (1965–1969)